Rastellus is a genus of African termite hunters first described by Norman I. Platnick & E. Griffin in 1990.

Species
 it contains seven species:
Rastellus africanus Platnick & Griffin, 1990 – Namibia, Botswana
Rastellus deserticola Haddad, 2003 – South Africa
Rastellus florisbad Platnick & Griffin, 1990 – South Africa
Rastellus kariba Platnick & Griffin, 1990 – Zimbabwe
Rastellus narubis Platnick & Griffin, 1990 – Namibia
Rastellus sabulosus Platnick & Griffin, 1990 – Namibia
Rastellus struthio Platnick & Griffin, 1990 – Namibia, Botswana

References

Ammoxenidae
Araneomorphae genera
Spiders of Africa